Sfinks (Polish for "Sphynx") was also the initial name of the Janusz A. Zajdel Award
In cryptography, SFINKS is a stream cypher algorithm developed by An Braeken, Joseph Lano, Nele Mentens, Bart Preneel, and Ingrid Verbauwhede. It includes a message authentication code. It has been submitted to the eSTREAM Project of the eCRYPT network. 

Stream ciphers
Cryptography